Rebecca L. Cann (born 1951) is a geneticist who made a scientific breakthrough on mitochondrial DNA variation and evolution in humans, popularly called Mitochondrial Eve. Her discovery that all living humans are genetically descended from a single African mother who lived <200,000 years ago became the foundation of the Out of Africa theory, the most widely accepted explanation of the origin of all modern humans. She is currently Professor in the Department of Cell and Molecular Biology at the University of Hawaiʻi at Mānoa.

Early life and education

Rebecca Cann was born in 1951 and spent her childhood at Des Moines, Iowa, where she completed her elementary schooling. In a summer, just before she started high school, her family moved to San Francisco, California. In 1967 she entered an all-girl Catholic High School in California. She earned a Bachelor of Science (BS) degree with a major in genetics at University of California, Berkeley in 1972. She then worked at Cutter Laboratories at Berkeley for five years (1972-1977) after finishing college, where she worked on macaque serum proteins and learned the techniques for constructing phylogenetic tree, which would be pivotal for her later achievements. She continued at UC Berkeley for her doctorate in genetics under the supervision of Allan Wilson of the Department of Biochemistry, and graduated in 1982. She got a Postdoctoral Fellowship at Howard Hughes Medical Institute (HHMI) of the University of California, San Francisco (UCSF). She joined the faculty of the Department of Genetics, University of Hawaii at Honolulu in 1986.

Mitochondrial Eve

Cann laid the experimental groundwork for the concept of Mitochondrial Eve, and the consequent Out of Africa theory.  From late 1970s she had collected mtDNA samples from women of different ethnic backgrounds, such as from Asia, South Pacific, Europe and Americans of African descent. The data were used in her PhD thesis in 1982. Following her research, a junior graduate student Mark Stoneking added samples from aboriginal Australians and New Guineans. In 1987, after a year of delay, their collective paper was published in Nature in which their findings indicated that all living humans were descended through a single mother, who lived ~200,000 years ago in Africa. The theoretical mother of all humans popularly became the Mitochondrial Eve, and the underlying concept directly implies recent African origin of modern humans, hence, the tenet of the so-called Out of Africa theory.

Personal life

She retains the surname Cann from her former husband whom she married in 1972, right after her graduation from Berkeley. In fact she helped her then husband through his graduate school and only when he finished, she started attending graduate school.

Cann was featured on MidWeek‘s cover on 19 March 1997 for her Mitochondrial Eve.

Bibliography

Wilson AC, Stoneking M, Cann RL, Prager EM, Ferris SD, Wrischnik LA, Higuchi RG. 1987. Mitochondrial clans and the age of our common mother. In: Human Genetics: Proceedings of the Seventh International Congress, Berlin 1986. F Vogel and K Sperling (eds.), Springer-Verlag, Berlin, pp. 158–164. 
Stoneking M, Cann RL. 1989. African origin of human mitochondrial DNA. In: The Human Revolution: Behavioural and Biological Perspectives on the Origins of Modern Humans. P Mellars and C Stringer (eds.), Edinburgh University Press, Edinburgh, pp. 17–30. 
Rebecca L. Cann. 1996.  Mitochondrial DNA and human evolution. In: Origins of the Human Brain. JP Changeux, J Chavaillon (eds). New York: Oxford University Press.  
Cann RL. 1997. Chapter 4: Mothers, Labels, and Misogyny. In: Women in Human Evolution. Hager LD (ed). Routledge, London, UK, pp. 75–89. 
Diller KC, Cann RL. 2009. Evidence against a genetic-based revolution in language 50,000 years ago. In: The Cradle of Language. R Botha, C Knight (eds). New York: Oxford University Press. pp. 135–149. 
 Diller KC, Cann RL. 2011. Molecular perspectives on human evolution. In: The Oxford Handbook of Language Evolution. KR Gibson, M Tallerman (eds). New York: Oxford University Press.

References

External links
University of Hawaii faculty directory 
JABSOM Faculty & Staff page
Author profile at BiomedExperts
Brief author biography at Oxford Handbook Online 
Brief author profile at eNotes
MidWeek

1951 births
Living people
Evolutionary biologists
Women evolutionary biologists
Human evolution theorists
University of Hawaiʻi faculty
People from Burlington, Iowa
University of California, Berkeley alumni
University of California, San Diego alumni
Human genetic history